"Dream Away" (Japanese: , O Ra I Na E) is a song by English rock musician George Harrison from his tenth studio album Gone Troppo (1982). The song was featured over the end credits of Harrison's 1981 HandMade Films production Time Bandits, which was director Terry Gilliam's first successful film outside of his work with Monty Python. Aside from the film's orchestral score, it was the only song featured in Time Bandits and was written specifically for the film. "Dream Away" was also issued as a single in Japan in February 1983.

Background
"Dream Away" was to originally appear on a planned Time Bandits soundtrack album. When that failed to materialise and Harrison was finalising the tracks for his Gone Troppo album, he decided to include "Dream Away".

In the 2011 documentary George Harrison: Living in the Material World, directed by Martin Scorsese, Gilliam recalled that late in the production of Time Bandits he came to see the song's lyrics as "notes" from Harrison on the things he liked and disliked about the film and on how Gilliam was "too arrogant and not listening!" Gilliam added: "And I thought it was the most brilliant, subtle, clever thing a man could ever do, to write a song. He's writing about things that he felt strongly about and yet he's too polite and decent and, I think, respectful of other artists, whatever form that takes, to interfere."

Release and reception
Although Gone Troppo was a commercial failure, "Dream Away" became a popular tune. People magazine's reviewer paired it with "Wake Up My Love" as the album's two "lovelies" and commented that "Because of his forays into the mystical, Harrison's penchant for whimsy often gets overlooked. But here the zany side gets no short shrift."

Writing in Goldmine magazine shortly after Harrison's death in November 2001, Dave Thompson said that while Gone Troppo was a far from essential album by the artist, "Dream Away" was a track that "stand[s] alongside any number of Harrison's minor classics". In 2010, AOL Radio listeners voted "Dream Away" at number 8 on the station's list of the "10 Best George Harrison Songs".

Personnel
 George Harrison – lead vocals, guitars and backing vocals
 Mike Moran – piano and synthesizer
 Alan Jones – bass
 Dave Mattacks – drums
 Ray Cooper – percussion
 Billy Preston – backing vocals
 Syreeta – backing vocals
 Sara Jones Recor Fleetwood – backing vocals

References

External links
 George Harrison – Dream Away (Time Bandits) on YouTube

1982 songs
1983 singles
George Harrison songs
Song recordings produced by George Harrison
Songs written by George Harrison
Music published by Oops Publishing and Ganga Publishing, B.V.